is the second in the Romance of the Three Kingdoms series of turn-based strategy games produced by Koei and based on the historical novel Romance of the Three Kingdoms.

Gameplay
Upon starting the game, players choose from one of six scenarios that determine the initial layout of power in ancient China. The scenarios loosely depict allegiances and territories controlled by the warlords as according to the novel, although gameplay does not follow events in the novel after the game begins.

The six scenarios are listed as follows:

 Dong Zhuo seizes control of Luoyang (AD 189)
 Warlords struggle for power (AD 194)
 Liu Bei seeks shelter in Jing Province (AD 201)
 Cao Cao covets supremacy over China (AD 208)
 The empire divides into three (AD 215)
 Rise of Wei, Wu and Shu (AD 220)

After choosing the scenario, players determine which warlord(s) they will control. Custom characters may be inserted into territories unoccupied by other forces, as well. A total of 41 different provinces exist, as well as over 200 unique characters. Each character has three statistics, which range from 10 to 100 (the higher the better). A warlord's Intelligence, War Ability and Charm influence how successful he or she will be when performing certain tasks, such as dueling or increasing land value in a province.

The player wins the game by conquering all territories in China. This is accomplished by being in control of every province on the map.

New features
A reputation system that affects the rate of officers' loyalties towards their lords
Added treasures and special items that can increase an officer's stats
Advisers can help their lords predict the chances of success in executing a plan. An adviser with Intelligence stat of 100 will always accurately predict the result.
Intercepting messengers
Ability to create new lords on the map based on custom characters created by players

Reception
Computer Gaming World stated that Romance of the Three Kingdoms II "did a better job of simulating the chaos of" second-century China than the game's predecessor. In a 1993 survey of pre 20th-century strategy games the magazine gave the game four stars out of five. On release, Famicom Tsūshin scored the Famicom version of the game a 30 out of 40.

References

External links
Japan Gamecity RTK2 page

GameFaqs Page

1989 video games
Amiga games
DOS games
Grand strategy video games
FM Towns games
Classic Mac OS games
MSX2 games
NEC PC-8801 games
NEC PC-9801 games
Nintendo Entertainment System games
PlayStation (console) games
2
Sharp X1 games
X68000 games
Sega Genesis games
Super Nintendo Entertainment System games
Turn-based strategy video games
Video game sequels
Video games developed in Japan
Windows games
WonderSwan games